The Fournier RF-9 is a two-seat motorglider of conventional sailplane configuration. Originally produced in France, manufacturing was later taken over by ABS Aircraft in Switzerland, and then by Gomolzig in Germany.  The pilot and passenger are accommodated side-by-side, and the aircraft's wings are foldable for ease of storage. It first flew in 1977. The licence-built example was known as the Fournier RF-9 ABS but only one, registration D-KHGO (w/nr.9021) was ever constructed. In 1994, ABS Aircraft GmbH left the development of ABS RF-9 though two further kits had been built, and were later constructed by the Polish Aircraft company Polavia.

Specifications (RF-9)

See also

 Fournier RF 4
 Fournier RF 5

1970s French sailplanes
Fournier aircraft
Motor gliders
Single-engined tractor aircraft
Low-wing aircraft
Aircraft first flown in 1977